Alf Kjellin (28 February 1920 – 5 April 1988) was a Swedish film actor and director, who also appeared on some television shows.

Biography
Kjellin underwent two changes of names in his early days in Hollywood. The first studio for which he worked billed him as Christopher Kent, and the next studio changed his name to Christopher Kelleen. He made one film using each name. Producer Stanley Kramer wanted him to make another change for another film, but Kjellin insisted on using his real name from that point on.

Kjellin was well established as a film actor when he occasionally took on roles in television shows. For example, in 1965 he prominently guest-starred as Stalag Luft Kommandant Colonel Max Richter in the two-part episode "P.O.W." (Episodes 30 and 31) of Twelve O'Clock High. He directed over 130 TV episodes for such shows as The Alfred Hitchcock Hour, The Man from U.N.C.L.E., The Waltons, Dynasty as well as the 1974 Columbo episodes Mind Over Mayhem and Negative Reaction and an episode of the 1976 series Sara.

Kjellin was born in Lund, Sweden and died in Los Angeles, California of a heart attack.

Selected filmography

 John Ericsson, Victor of Hampton Roads (1937) – Young man on Delamater's office (uncredited)
 Med folket för fosterlandet (1938) – Young Man Who Receives Soccer Scores (uncredited)
 Gläd dig i din ungdom (1939) – Henning
 Kadettkamrater (1939) – Greggy Ståhlkrantz
 Stål (1940) – Erik, young worker
 Juninatten (1940) – Assistant Physician (uncredited)
 Hans nåds testamente (1940) – Jacob
 Bright Prospects (1941) – Åke Dahlberg
 The Fight Continues (1941) – Dr. Georg Hammar
 Night in Port (1943) – Arnold
 I Killed (1943) – Harris
 Gentleman with a Briefcase (1943) – Lennart Dalén
 Appassionata (1944) – Eric
 The Invisible Wall (1944) – Ivan Levy
 Torment (1944) – Jan-Erik Widgren
 Prince Gustaf (1944) – Prince Gustaf
 Vandring med månen (1945) – Dan Killander
 Affairs of a Model (1946) – Erik Lunde
 Iris and the Lieutenant (1946) – Robert Motander
 Sunshine Follows Rain (1946) – Jon
 The Girl from the Marsh Croft (1947) – Gudmund Erlandsson
 Woman Without a Face (1947) – Martin Grande
 Madame Bovary (1949) – Leon Dupuis
 Singoalla (1949) – Knight Erland Månesköld
 This Can't Happen Here (1950) – Björn Almkvist
 The White Cat (1950) – The Man Without Identity
 In the Arms of the Sea (1951) – Martin Winner
 Summer Interlude (1951) – David Nyström
 Divorced (1951) – Dr. Bertil Nordelius
 My Six Convicts (1952) – Clem Randall
 The Iron Mistress (1952) – Philippe de Cabanal
 The Juggler (1953) – Daniel
 No Man's Woman (1953) – Arne Persson
 The Chieftain of Göinge (1953) – Lieutenant Henrik Wrede
 Flicka utan namn (1954) – Erland Ljung
 The Girl in the Rain (1955) – Martin Andreasson
 Blockerat spår (1955) – Himself
 Egen ingång (1956) – Arvid Stenman
 The Stranger from the Sky (1956) – Stig Hallman
 My Passionate Longing (1956) – Mikael
 A Guest in His Own House (1957) – Age Dahl
 Summer Place Wanted (1957) – Arne Forsman, Artist
 The Mysterians (1957) – Yamamoto (voice)
 Playing on the Rainbow (1958) – Björn Rådström
 Only a Waiter (1959) – Directed
 Panic in Paradise (1960) – Frederik
 The Pleasure Garden (1961, director) 
 Karneval (1961) – Ragnar Ennart
 Two Living, One Dead (1961) – Rogers
 The Victors (1963) – Priest
 Min kära är en ros (1963) – P.G. Nilsson
 Ship of Fools (1965) – Freytag
 Assault on a Queen (1966) – Eric Lauffnauer
 Ice Station Zebra (1968) – Col. Ostrovsky
 Midas Run (1969 – directed)
 The McMasters (1970 – directed)
 Zandy's Bride (1974) – Avery (uncredited)

References

External links

1920 births
1988 deaths
People from Lund
Swedish film directors
20th-century Swedish male actors
Expatriate male actors in the United States
Swedish expatriates in the United States